Gustaaf Paul Robert Magnel (born 15 September 1889 in Essen (Belgium); died 5 July 1955 in Ghent) was a Belgian engineer and professor at Ghent University, known for his expertise regarding reinforced concrete and prestressed concrete.

Biography 
Gustave Magnel studied civil engineering at Ghent University from 1907 to 1912. He left Belgium in 1914 and worked as a civil engineer at the D. G. Somerville & Co. Contractor Company until 1917, finally becoming chief engineer there. After he returned to Belgium from the UK in 1919, he joined the Strength of Materials Laboratory at Ghent University. He first started lecturing at the university in 1922 and went on to become a lecturer in 1927 and, finally, full professor of concrete and reinforced concrete construction as well as director of the Laboratory for Reinforced Concrete Construction in 1937. The French Association des Ingénieurs Docteurs honoured Magnel with its Grande Médaille, and he received the Frank P. Brown Medal from the Franklin Institute of Philadelphia. Magnel was elected a member of the Belgian Academy of Sciences and represented his country at UNESCO from 1945 to 1946. Further honours include Commander of the Yugoslavian St. Sava Order and Chevalier de la Légion d’Honneur. 

Magnel was one of the pioneers of prestressed concrete and the inventor of a prestressing anchorage system named after him and Blaton. His list of publications runs to about 200 titles, including the four-volume La pratique du calcul du béton armé and his book on prestressed concrete Le béton précontraint, which was translated into several languages. Magnel supported Eugène Freyssinet during the foundation of the Fédération Internationale de la Précontrainte (FIP) and was its first vice-president. He was regarded not only as a brilliant university teacher and researcher, but also as a structural engineer. For instance, he was the first person to use prestressed continuous beams – in his design for Sclayn Bridge near Andenne; and it was Magnel’s Walnut Lane Memorial Bridge that inaugurated the use of prestressed concrete in the USA. Magnel’s monograph on prestressed concrete was therefore unique because it provided a comprehensive scientific footing for this form of construction for the first time; it was an outstanding document at the transition from the invention phase (1925-1950) to the innovation phase (1950-1975) of theory of structures.

Works 
 Calcul pratique de la poutre Vierendeel. Ghent: Editions Fecheyr, 1933. (in French)
 La pratique du calcul du béton armé. Vol. III, 3rd ed. Ghent: Editions Fecheyr, 1946. (in French)
 Stabilité des Constructions. Vols. I & II, 3rd ed., Vols. III & IV, 2nd ed. Ghent: Editions Fecheyr, 1948. (in French)
 Prestressed concrete, 1948. 1st ed.
 Le béton précontraint. Ghent: Editions Fecheyr, 1948. (in French)
 La pratique du calcul du béton armé. Vols. I & II, 5th ed. Ghent: Editions Fecheyr, 1949. (in French)
 Hormigon Précomprimido. Buenos Aires, 1950. (in Spanich)
 La pratique du calcul du béton armé. Vol. IV, 3rd ed. Ghent: Editions Fecheyr, 1953. (in French)
 Prestressed concrete. New 3rd ed. New York: McGraw-Hill, 1954.
 Theorie und Praxis des Spannbetons. Trans. from the French by H. Schröder. Wiesbaden/Berlin: Bauverlag, 1956. (in German)

Further reading 
Campus, F., Notice sur Gustave Magnel. In: Annuaire de l’Académie royale des sciences, des lettres et des beaux-arts de Belgique, pp. 1-39, 1970; Brussels. (in French)

References 

 "Gustaaf Magnel" (p. 147) in De Markanten, Uitgeverij Davidsfonds, Leuven,

External links 
Beton in de Belgische architectuur (1945–1970) (Dutch)
Gustaaf Magnel (1889–1955) (Dutch)

1889 births
1955 deaths
People from Essen, Belgium
Belgian expatriates in England